Martin. B. Nielsen (born November 18, 1981) is a Danish Cruiserweight professional boxer who made his debut on 14 June 2002. He won the IBF Youth Heavyweight Champion title on 12 November 2004 and IBF Youth Super Middleweight Champion title on 13 March 2004.

External links
Boxrec statistics

1981 births
Living people
Danish male boxers
Super-middleweight boxers
Cruiserweight boxers
Place of birth missing (living people)
21st-century Danish people